Kyung-ok, also spelled Kyong-ok, is a Korean feminine given name. Its meaning differs based on the hanja used to write each syllable of the name. There are 54 hanja with the reading "kyung" and five hanja with the reading "ok" on the South Korean government's official list of hanja which may be registered for use in given names. Kyung-ok was the tenth-most popular name for baby girls born in South Korea in 1950.

People with this name include:
Kang Kyung-ok (born 1965), South Korean manhwa artist 
Kim Kyung-ok (born 1983), South Korean judoka
Kim Kyong-ok, North Korean politician, member of the Central Military Commission of the Workers' Party of Korea
Ri Kyong-ok, North Korean judoka, represented North Korea at the 2004 Summer Olympics

See also
List of Korean given names

References

Korean feminine given names